Eben Sumner Draper (August 30, 1893 – April 17, 1959) was an American businessman and politician who served in the Massachusetts General Court, was president of the Milford National Bank & Trust, and was the last member of his family to serve on the board of directors of the Draper Corporation. He was the son of Massachusetts Governor Eben Sumner Draper.

Early life
Draper was born on August 30, 1893 in Hopedale, Massachusetts, to Eben S. Draper Sr. and Nannie Draper (nee Bristow). He graduated from Noble and Greenough School. In 1913, he was a member of the crew of the power schooner Polar Bear, which took part in a scientific expedition in the Arctic Circle. The Polar Bear froze in the ice near Flaxman Island (halfway between Herschel Island and Point Barrow). The crew disembarked and walked to Circle City. From there, they went to Fairbanks and then to Valdez, where they took a steamer to Seattle. In 1915 he graduated from Harvard College. After college, he spent two years as a mechanic at the Draper Corporation.

World War I
During World War I, Draper was a captain in the American Expeditionary Forces. He entered first officer's training school in Plattsburgh, New York in May 1917. He was commissioned as a 2nd lieutenant in the heavy artillery on August 15, 1917. He sailed to France on September 12, 1917. Upon arrival, Draper spent three months in a French artillery school. He then serve two months with the British artillery. He took part in the Second Battle of the Marne and the Meuse-Argonne Offensive. In October 1918 he received his commission as a captain.

Personal life
While serving in France, Draper met Red Cross worker Ruth Lawrence Carroll. The couple married on August 30, 1919 in Paul Smiths, New York. They resided at The Ledges, the former home of Draper's father, in Hopedale, Massachusetts. The couple had one daughter, Nancy, born on August 28, 1922. On July 24, 1926, Ruth Draper was granted a divorce in Paris on the ground of desertion. She was awarded custody of their daughter.

On November 12, 1926, Draper married Hazel Archibald in Rutherford, New Jersey. After their marriage, Draper tore down "The Ledges" and build a new mansion (also known as "The Ledges") for her. In October 1935, Hazel Draper suffered a mental breakdown following an operation. On April 18, she had left the Four Winds Sanitarium in Katonah, New York, where she had been staying for four months. She was last seen on April 20, 1936, boarding the Georgic. There were concerns that she may have committed suicide by jumping off of the ship, however on April 29, she was found stowed away in a tank room.

Political career
Draper represented the 8th Worcester District in the Massachusetts House of Representatives in 1921 and 1922. He then represented the 4th Worcester District in the Massachusetts Senate from 1923 to 1927. In 1928 he sought the Republican nomination for the United States Senate seat held by Democrat David I. Walsh. He was supported by the Constitutional Liberty League, a "wet" organization that opposed prohibition. He lost the Republican primary to Benjamin Loring Young, receiving 36% of the vote to Young's 41% (Butler Ames received the remaining 23%). Draper ran for a U.S. Senate seat again in 1930. He lost the Republican primary to William M. Butler by 6,591 votes.

Business career
From 1919 to 1934, Draper was a director of the Milford National Bank & Trust. On October 1, 1934 he was elected president of the bank. Draper also served as president of the Milford Hospital.

From 1935 to 1955, Draper was a director of the Draper Corporation. He was the last member of his family to serve on the company's board.

Draper died on April 17, 1959 at Massachusetts General Hospital, where he had been staying since undergoing a major surgery the previous month.

See also
 1921–1922 Massachusetts legislature
 1923–1924 Massachusetts legislature
 1925–1926 Massachusetts legislature

References

1893 births
1959 deaths
20th-century American politicians
United States Army personnel of World War I
Harvard College alumni
Republican Party Massachusetts state senators
Republican Party members of the Massachusetts House of Representatives
People from Hopedale, Massachusetts